Laura River is a river in the east Kimberley region of Western Australia.

The headwaters of the river rise in the Bailey Range, approximately 20 km south of Halls Creek; the river then flows in a south-westerly direction crossing the Great Northern Highway near Dillinger Bore before discharging into the Mary River of which it is a tributary.

The river was named in 1884 by government surveyor George Russell Turner, of the 1884 Kimberley Survey Expedition, who possibly named it after Laura Eliza Frances Forrest (1877-1960), the niece of Surveyor General John Forrest.

References

Rivers of the Kimberley region of Western Australia